Robert Rae "Bob" Spears Jr. (June 18, 1918 – March 18, 2008) was a prominent American prelate who served as Bishop of Rochester from 1970 to 1984.

Childhood and education
Spears was born on June 18, 1918, in Rochester, New York, the son of Robert Rae Spears and Phebe Elizabeth Wing. He graduated from Hobart College in Upstate New York in 1940 with a Bachelor of Arts. He answered the call to holy orders in the Episcopal Church. He graduated from The General Theological Seminary in New York City in 1943 with a Bachelor of Sacred Theology. He was awarded a Doctor of Divinity in 1969.

Priest
Spears was ordained a deacon on June 24, 1943, and priest on May 15, 1944, both by Bishop Cameron Josiah Davis of Western New York. He served as curate of St Stephen's Church in Olean, New York from 1943 till 1944 after which he became rector of St Paul's Church in Mayville, New York. On February 15, 1948, he became canon of St Paul's Cathedral in Buffalo, New York. He served as rector of St Peter's Church in Auburn, New York from 1950 till 1954, when he became vicar of the Chapel of the Intercession in New York City, where he remained till September 1, 1960. From 1960 till 1967 he served as rector of Trinity Church in Princeton, New Jersey.

Bishop
Spears was elected Suffragan Bishop of West Missouri in November 1966. He was consecrated on May 15, 1967, by Presiding Bishop John E. Hines. On April 26, 1970, he was elected Bishop of Rochester. He was consecrated under apostolic succession by the Presiding Bishop He supported female ordination in the 1970s, then a controversial subject. He was best known for his liberal views. Spears was an important leader in the Episcopal Church's progressive wing. He was in favor of the decision to ordain women. He opposed the Vietnam War, and spoke out against violence during the Attica Prison riot. He was also an early proponent of involvement in the Episcopal Church by its gay and lesbian members. He co-chaired the Episcopal Church's Standing Commission on Human Affairs and Health from 1976 to 1979 He retired in 1984 and served as Associate at St James' Church on Madison Avenue in New York City. At the time of his death he was an Associate at St Thomas' Church in Rochester, New York. He died on March 18, 2008.

Family
Spears was married to his wife Charlotte Luttrell for decades, and they had three children and three grandchildren.

See also

 List of Bishop Succession in the Episcopal Church

References

External links
 Rochester Episcopal Diocese web site
 Integrity web site

Anglo-Catholic bishops
1908 births
2008 deaths
American Anglo-Catholics
Religious leaders from Rochester, New York
Hobart and William Smith Colleges alumni
General Theological Seminary alumni
20th-century American Episcopalians
Episcopal bishops of Rochester
20th-century American clergy